Pleurospermopsis is a genus of flowering plants belonging to the family Apiaceae.

Its native range is Himalaya to Southern Central China.

Species:
 Pleurospermopsis bicolor (Franch.) Jing Zhou & Jin Wei
 Pleurospermopsis sikkimensis (C.B.Clarke) C.Norman

References

Apioideae
Apioideae genera